Takhteh may refer to:
 Takhteh, Fars
 Takhteh, Gilan
 Takhteh, Kurdistan